Girishwar Misra (born 21 April 1951) is a social scientist, psychologist and author from India. He obtained an M.A. and Ph.D. in Psychology from Gorakhpur University. He started his career as lecturer in psychology at Lecturer, Gorakhpur University in 1970. Thereafter he remained Reader at Allahabad University (1979-1983), Professor, Bhopal University (1983-1993), before joining as Professor, Delhi University in 1993, where he served for the rest of his career.

In 1991-1992, Misra was a Fulbright Fellow in the United States at Swarthmore College and at the University of Michigan.

He was the vice chancellor of Mahatma Gandhi Antarrashtriya Hindi Vishwavidyalaya in Wardha, Maharashtra, India.

Professor Misra is the chief editor of the fifth ICSSR Survey of Psychology published by Indian Council of Social Science Research (ICSSR).
For 15 years, until the end of 2015, he was editor of Psychological Studies, a journal of the National Academy of Psychology, India. 
As of 2016, he was continuing as the special issue editor of Psychological Studies.

He has been one of the leaders of the emerging field of Indian psychology.

Award
National award in the field of social science for the year 2009, Govt. of Madhya Pradesh, India

Works in English
 Psychological Consequences of Prolonged Deprivation (with L. B. Tripathi)
 Deprivation: Its Social Roots and Psychological Consequences (with D. Sinha and R. C. Tripathi)
 Perspectives on Indigenous Psychology (with A. K. Mohanty)
 Psychological Perspectives on Health and Stress, Psychology of Poverty and Social Disadvantage (with A. K. Mohanty)
 Applied Social Psychology in India, New Directions in Indian Psychology, Vol. 1: Social Psychology (with A. K. Dalal)
 Towards a Culturally Relevant Psychology (with J. Prakash)
 Rethinking Intelligence (with A. K. Srivastava)
 Psychology and Societal Development: Paradigmatic and Social Concerns

Works in Hindi
 Bal apradh
 Taki usaka Bachapan vapas mil sake
 Ek vikas shil desh main manovigyan: Bhartiya anubhava (Hindi Translation of D. Sinha’s book entitled “Psychology in a third world country
 Mangal Prabhat ki Pratiksha me

References

External links
 Girishwar Misra appointed VC of Mahatma Gandhi International Hindi University
Indian Council of Philosophical Research

Hindi-language writers
Indian social sciences writers
1951 births
Living people
Indian psychologists
Writers from Uttar Pradesh
Deen Dayal Upadhyay Gorakhpur University alumni
Academic staff of Deen Dayal Upadhyay Gorakhpur University
Psychology writers
Social psychologists
Indian academic administrators
Academic journal editors
Academic staff of the University of Allahabad
Academic staff of Delhi University